Four Danish research ships have carried the name Dana
 Dana (1919), four-masted motor schooner, 1919–1924
 Dana (1921), deep-sea steam trawler, 1921–1935, former HMT John Quilliam
 Dana (1937), deep-sea trawler, 1937–1980, now rigged as 3-masted schooner, Gulden Leeuw
 Dana (1980), research vessel, 1980–present

Ship names